The 1970 Colorado State Rams football team was an American football team that represented Colorado State University in the Western Athletic Conference (WAC) during the 1970 NCAA University Division football season.  In its first season under head coach Jerry Wampfler, the team compiled a 4–7 record (1–3 against WAC opponents) and was outscored by a total of 256 to 206. 

Colorado State's junior running back, Lawrence McCutcheon, rushed for 1,008 yards and caught 34 passes for 486 yards. Other statistical leaders on the 1970 Colorado State team include quarterback Wayne Smith with 1,861 passing yards and Tim Labus with 573 receiving yards.

Schedule

Roster

References

Colorado State
Colorado State Rams football seasons
Colorado State Rams football